Total Club Hits 2 is a compilation album released on January 6, 2009.  This is the second album in the Total Club Hits series.

Track listing

All of the tracks included in this album were mixed by DJ Skribble and DJ Slynkee.

References 

2009 compilation albums
Dance music compilation albums